The 39th Fajr Film Festival (Persian: سی و نهمین جشنواره فیلم فجر) was held from 1 to 11 February 2021 in Tehran, Iran. The nominees for the 39th Fajr Film Festival were announced on February 10, 2021, at a press conference.

Jury

Main Competition 

 Mohammad Ehsani
 Sareh Bayat
 Morteza Poursamadi
 Bahram Tavakoli
 Nima Javidi
 Seyyed Jamal Sadatian
 Mostafa Kiaei

First Look, Short Film, Documentary 

 Saeed Pouresmaili
 Amir Tooderousta
 Mohammad Ali Farsi
 Mohammad Kart
 Sam Kalantari

Advertising Competition 

 Ebrahim Haghighi
 Mitra Mohaseni
 Meysam Molaei

Winners and nominees

Main Competition

First Look

Advertising Competition

Films with multiple wins

Films with multiple nominations

Films

Main Competition

First Look

Documentary

Short Film

References

External links 
 

Fajr International Film Festival ceremonies
Fajr Film Festival
Fajr Film Festival
Fajr Film Festival
Fajr Film Festival